Richard Hardware (born 4 December 1950) is a Jamaican sprinter. He competed in the men's 200 metres at the 1972 Summer Olympics.

References

1950 births
Living people
Athletes (track and field) at the 1972 Summer Olympics
Athletes (track and field) at the 1974 British Commonwealth Games
Jamaican male sprinters
Olympic athletes of Jamaica
Place of birth missing (living people)
Commonwealth Games competitors for Jamaica